The 2014 Empire Slovak Open was a professional tennis tournament played on outdoor clay courts. It was the sixth edition of the tournament and part of the 2014 ITF Women's Circuit, offering a total of $75,000 in prize money. It took place in Trnava, Slovakia, on 5–11 May 2014.

Singles main draw entrants

Seeds 

 1 Rankings as of 28 April 2014

Other entrants 
The following players received wildcards into the singles main draw:
  Dalma Gálfi
  Viktória Kužmová
  Kristína Schmiedlová
  Tereza Smitková

The following players received entry from the qualifying draw:
  Denisa Allertová
  Margarita Gasparyan
  Andreea Mitu
  Renata Voráčová

The following player received entry by a protected ranking:
  Evgeniya Rodina

The following player received entry into the singles main draw as a lucky loser:
  Barbora Krejčíková

Champions

Singles 

  Anna Karolína Schmiedlová def.  Barbora Záhlavová-Strýcová 6–4, 6–2

Doubles 

  Stephanie Vogt /  Zheng Saisai def.  Margarita Gasparyan /  Evgeniya Rodina 6–4, 6–2

External links 
 2014 Empire Slovak Open at ITFtennis.com
 

2014 ITF Women's Circuit
2014
2014
2014 in Slovak women's sport
Sport in Trnava
2014 in Slovak tennis